Tithal is an out growth in Valsad district of Gujarat. Tithal is located around 4.1 kilometer away from its district headquarter Valsad. It is known for its beach with brownish-black color soil. Swaminarayan temple, Saibaba temple and Shantidham temple are local places of worship in Tithal.

Gallery

References

Cities and towns in Valsad district